Punascha (Bengali: পুুুুনশ্চ; English: Postscript) is a book of Bengali poems written by Rabindranath Tagore. It was published in 1932. Tagore wrote the book in the new style, prose poems. It deals with the human problems regarding life and death. Tagore dedicated this work to Nitu. There are 50 poems in the book.

List of poems 
The poems of "Punascha" are:

 Natok
 Patra
 Phank
 Sundar
 Bichhed
 Sahajatri
 Balak
 Camelia
 Ekjon lok
 Khyeti
 Bhiru
 Shuchi
 Premer sona
 Asthane
 Mrityo
 Shapmochan
 Poila ashwin
 
 Nutan kaal
 Pukur-dhare
 Basa
 Shesh dan
 Smriti
 Biswashok
 Chera kagojer jhuri
 Shalikh
 Khelnar mukti
 Banshi
 Tirthajatri
 Rangrejini
 Snansamapan
 Ghorchara
Manabputra
Chuti
Kopai
Khowai
Aparadhi
Dekha
Komalgandhar
Cheleta
Shesh chiti
Kiter sangsar
Sadharan meye
Patralekha
Unnati
Chiraruper bani
Mukti
Prothom puja
Chutir ayojon
Sishutirtha
Gaaner basa

References 

1932 poetry books
Bengali poetry collections
Poetry collections by Rabindranath Tagore
Indian_poetry_books
Works by Rabindranath Tagore